Jean Becker (15 June 1922 – 1 November 2009) was a Luxembourgish footballer. He played in nine matches for the Luxembourg national football team from 1948 to 1950. He was also part of Luxembourg's squad for the football tournament at the 1948 Summer Olympics, but he did not play in any matches.

References

External links
 

1922 births
2009 deaths
Luxembourgian footballers
Luxembourg international footballers
Place of birth missing
Association football midfielders
Stade Dudelange players